Kseniya Pavlovna Kutepova (born 1 August 1971) is a Russian actress, Merited Artist of the Russian Federation, the winner of State Prize of the Russian Federation. She has appeared in over 40 films. Twin sister of actress Polina Kutepova.

Biography 
Kseniya was born on August 1, 1971, in Moscow. Already in her school years, together with her sister Polina, she studied in a theater studio and acted in two films. In 1988 she entered the directing department of Russian Institute of Theatre Arts in the studio of Pyotr Fomenko, after which she worked at the Moscow theatre Pyotr Fomenko Workshop and actively acted in films. Kseniya is the wife of Sergey Osipyan, she has two children.

Selected filmography

References

External links 
 Kseniya Kutepova on kino-teatr.ru

 1971 births
Living people
Soviet actresses
Soviet child actresses
Russian film actresses
Russian stage actresses
Russian television actresses
Actresses from Moscow

Russian twins

20th-century Russian actresses
21st-century Russian actresses